The Italian Communist Party (PCI) was a political party in Italy. The PCI was founded as the Communist Party of Italy (PCd'I) on 21 January 1921 in Livorno when it seceded from the Italian Socialist Party (PSI). Amadeo Bordiga, Antonio Gramsci, and Nicola Bombacci led the communist split. Outlawed during the Italian fascist regime, the party played a major role in the Italian resistance movement.

The party changed its name in 1943 to PCI and became the second largest political party of Italy after World War II, attracting the support of about a third of the vote share during the 1970s. At the time, it was the largest Communist party in the Western world, with peak support reaching 2.3 million members in 1947, and peak share being 34.4% of the vote (12.6 million votes) in the 1976 Italian general election. The PCI was part of the Constituent Assembly of Italy and the Italian government from 1944 to 1947, when the United States ordered a removal from government of the PCI and PSI. The PCI–PSI alliance lasted until 1956; the two parties continued to govern at the local and regional level until the 1990s. Apart from the 1944–1947 years and occasional external support to the Organic centre-left, which included the PSI, the PCI always remained at the opposition in the Italian Parliament, with more accommodation as part of the Historic Compromise of the 1970s, which ended in 1980, until its dissolution in 1991, not without controversy and much debate among its members.

The PCI included Marxist–Leninists and Marxist revisionists, with a notable faction being the miglioristi. Under the leadership of Enrico Berlinguer and the influence of the miglioristi in the 1970s and 1980s, Marxism–Leninism was removed from the party statute. The PCI adhered to the Eurocommunist trend that sought independence from the Soviet Union, and moved into a democratic socialist direction. In 1991, it was dissolved and re-launched as the Democratic Party of the Left (PDS), which joined the Socialist International and the Party of European Socialists. The more radical members of the organisation formally seceded to establish the Communist Refoundation Party (PRC).

History

Early years 

The roots of the PCI date back to 1921, when the I Congress of the Communist Party of Italy was held in Livorno on 21 January, following a split in the XVII Congress of the Italian Socialist Party. The split occurred after the Congress of Livorno refused to expel the reformist group as required by the Communist International (Comintern). The main factions of the new party were L'Ordine Nuovo, based in Turin and led by Antonio Gramsci, and the Maximalist faction led by Nicola Bombacci. Amedeo Bordiga was elected secretary of the new party.

The party was officially founded as the Communist Party of Italy – Section of the Communist International (Partito Comunista d'Italia – Sezione dell'Internazionale Comunista), since the Comintern was structured as a single world party according to Vladimir Lenin's vision. In the 1921 Italian general election, the party obtained 4.6% of the vote and 15 seats in the country's Chamber of Deputies. At the time, it was an active yet small faction within the Italian political left, which was strongly led by the PSI, while on the international level it was Soviet-led.

During its 2nd Congress in 1922, the new party registered 43,000 members. This was in part due to the entrance of almost the whole Socialist Youth Federation (Federazione Giovanile Socialista). The party adopted a slim structure headed by a Central Committee of 15 members, five of whom were also in the Executive Committee (EC), namely Ambrogio Belloni, Nicola Bombacci, Amadeo Bordiga (EC), Bruno Fortichiari (EC), Egidio Gennari, Antonio Gramsci, Ruggero Grieco (EC), Anselmo Marabini, Francesco Misiano, Giovanni Parodi, Luigi Polano, Luigi Repossi (EC), Cesare Sessa, Ludovico Tarsia, and Umberto Terracini (EC).

Since its formation, the party strived to organise itself on some bases that were not a mere reproduction of the traditional parties' bases. It then took again some arguments that distinguished the battle within the PSI, namely the idea that it is necessary to form an environment fiercely hostile to bourgeois society and that is an anticipation of the future socialist society. The purpose of this was not considered utopian because already in this society, especially in production, some structures are born on future results. In the first years of the PCd'I, there was no official leader; the accepted leader, first of the faction/tendency and then of the party, was Bordiga (Left) of the communist left current. Leaders of the minority currents were Angelo Tasca (Right) and Gramsci (Centre).

Conflict between factions 
As a territorial section of Comintern, the PCd'I adopted the same program, the same conception of the party and the same tactics adopted by the II Congress in Moscow of 1920. The official program, drawn up in ten points, began with the intrinsically catastrophic nature of the capitalist system and terminated with the extinction of the state. It follows in a synthetic way the model outlined by Lenin for the Russian Communist Party (Bolsheviks). For a while, this identity resisted, but the fast progress of the reaction in Europe produced a change of tactics in a democratic direction within the Bolshevik party and consequently within the Comintern. This happened in particular regarding the possibility, previously opposed, of an alliance with the social democratic and bourgeois parties. This provoked a tension in the party between the majority (Left) and the minority factions (the Right and the Centre) supported by the Comintern. The proposals of the Left were no longer accepted and the conflict between the factions became irremediable.

Bolshevization 

In 1923, some members of the party were arrested and put on trial for "conspiracy against the State". This allowed the intense activity of the Communist International to deprive the party's left-wing of authority and give control to the minority centre which had aligned with Moscow. In 1924–1925, the Comintern began a campaign of Bolshevization, which forced each party to conform to the discipline and orders of Moscow. During the clandestine conference held in Como to ratify the party leadership in May 1924, 35 of the 45 federation secretaries, plus the secretary of the youth federation, voted for Bordiga's Left, four for Gramsci's Centre, and five for Tasca's Right.

Before the Lyon Congress in 1926, the Centre won almost all the votes in the absence of much of the Left, who were unable to attend as a result of fascist controls and lack of Comintern support. Recourse to the Comintern against this evident manoeuvre had little effect. The PCd'I as conceived by the Left terminated. The organisation continued with the support of the Comintern and a new structure and leadership. In 1922, the newspaper L'Ordine Nuovo was closed and in 1924 a new Centre newspaper, l'Unità, edited by Gramsci, was founded. The Left continued as a faction, principally functioning in exile. It published the newspaper Bilan, a monthly theoretical bulletin.

In 1926, Bordiga and Gramsci were arrested and imprisoned on the island of Ustica. In 1927, Palmiro Togliatti was elected secretary in place of Gramsci. In 1930, Bordiga was expelled from the Comintern and accused of Trotskyism. After Joseph Stalin dissolved the Communist International in 1943, the exiled members of the PCd'I in Moscow changed the party's name to the PCI on 15 May. Under this name, it reorganised in Italy and became a parliamentary party after the fall of Fascism.

Name change 
On 15 May 1943, the party changed its official name in Italian Communist Party (Partito Comunista Italiano), often shortened to PCI. This change was not surprising as PCI started being used as the party's acronym around 1924–1925. This name change also reflected a change in the Comintern's role—it increasingly became a federation of national communist parties. This trend accelerated after Lenin's death and its new name emphasised the party's shift from an international focus to an Italian one. At the time, it was a hotly contested issue for the two major factions of the party. On one side, the Leninist preferred the single world party as it was internationalist and strongly centralised while on the other side the Italians wanted a party more tailored to their nation's peculiarities and more autonomy.

World War II 
After the fall of the Fascist regime in Italy on 25 July 1943, the PCI returned to a formally legal status, playing a major role during the national liberation, known in Italy as Resistenza ("Resistance") and forming many partisan groups. In the April 1944 after the svolta di Salerno (Salerno's turn), Togliatti agreed to cooperate with King Victor Emmanuel III and his Prime Minister, the Marshal Pietro Badoglio. After the turn, Communists took part in every government during the national liberation and constitutional period from June 1944 to May 1947.

The Communists' contribution to the new Italian democratic constitution was decisive. The Gullo decrees of 1944, named after Fausto Gullo, sought to improve social and economic conditions in the countryside. During Badoglio and Ferruccio Parri's cabinets, Togliatti served as the Deputy Prime Minister of Italy. During the Resistance, the PCI became increasingly popular, as the majority of partisans were communists. The Garibaldi Brigades, promoted by the PCI, were among the more numerous partisan forces.

Post-war years 
The PCI took part in the 1946 Italian general election and the 1946 Italian institutional referendum, campaigning for a republic. In the election, the PCI was third, behind Christian Democracy (DC) and the PSI, gaining almost 19% of votes and electing 104 members of the Constituent Assembly of Italy. While the popular referendum resulted in the replacement of the monarchy with a republic, with the 54% of votes in favour and 46% against.

As part of the May 1947 crises, the PCI was excluded from government. The DC prime minister, Alcide De Gasperi, was losing popularity, and feared that the leftist coalition would take power. While the PCI was growing particularly fast due to its organising efforts supporting sharecroppers in Sicily, Tuscany, and Umbria, movements that were also bolstered by the reforms of Fausto Gullo, the Italian Minister of Agriculture. On 1 May, the nation was thrown into crisis by the Portella della Ginestra massacre, in which eleven leftist peasants (including four children) were murdered at an International Workers' Day parade in Palermo by Salvatore Giuliano and his gang. In the political chaos that ensued, the United States government engineered the expulsion of all left-wing ministers from the cabinet on 31 May. The PCI would not have a national position in government again. De Gasperi did this under pressure from the United States Secretary of State, George Marshall, who had informed him that anti-communism was a pre-condition for receiving American aid, and Ambassador James Clement Dunn, who had directly asked de Gasperi to dissolve the parliament and remove the PCI.

In the 1948 Italian general election, the party joined the PSI in the Popular Democratic Front (FDP) but was defeated by DC. The United States government provided support to anti-PCI groups in the election, and argued that should the PCI win, the Marshall Plan and other aids could be terminated. It spent $10–20 million on anti-communist propaganda and other covert operations, much of it through the Economic Cooperation Administration of the Marshall Plan, and then laundered through individual banks. Fearful of the possible FDP's electoral victory, the British and American governments also undermined their campaign for legal justice by tolerating the efforts made by Italy's top authorities to prevent any of the alleged Italian war criminals from being extradited and taken to court. The denial of Italian war crimes was backed up by the Italian state, academe, and media, re-inventing Italy as only a victim of Nazism and the post-war Foibe massacres.

The party gained considerable electoral success during the following years and occasionally supplied external support to the Organic centre-left governments, although it never directly joined a government. It successfully lobbied Fiat to set up the AvtoVAZ (Lada) car factory in the Soviet Union (1966). The party did best in Emilia-Romagna, Tuscany, and Umbria, where it regularly won the local administrative elections, and in some of the industrialised cities of Northern Italy. At the city government level during the course of the post-war period, the PCI demonstrated in cities like Bologna and Florence their capacity for uncorrupt, efficient and clean government. After the 1975 Italian local elections, the PCI was the strongest force in nearly all of the municipal councils of the great cities.

From the 1950s to the 1960s 

The Soviet Union's brutal suppression of the Hungarian Revolution of 1956 created a split within the PCI. The party leadership, including Palmiro Togliatti and Giorgio Napolitano (who in 2006 became President of Italy), regarded the Hungarian insurgents as counter-revolutionaries as reported at the time in l'Unità, the official PCI newspaper. Giuseppe Di Vittorio, chief of the communist trade union Italian General Confederation of Labour (CGIL), repudiated the leadership position, as did prominent party member Antonio Giolitti and Italian Socialist Party national secretary Pietro Nenni, a close ally of the PCI. Napolitano later hinted at doubts over the propriety of his decision. He would eventually write in From the Communist Party to European Socialism. A Political Autobiography (Dal Pci al socialismo europeo. Un'autobiografia politica) that he regretted his justification of the Soviet intervention but quieted his concerns at the time for the sake of party unity and the international leadership of Soviet Communism. Giolitti and Nenni went on to split with the PCI over this issue. Napolitano became a leading member of the miglioristi faction within the PCI that promoted a social-democratic direction in party policy.

In the mid-1960s, the United States Department of State estimated the party membership to be approximately 1,350,000, or 4.2% of the working age population, making it the largest Communist party in per capita terms in the capitalist world at the time and the largest party at all in the whole of Western Europe with the Social Democratic Party of Germany. United States government sources said that the party was receiving $40–50 million per year from the Soviets when their investment in Italy was $5–6 million. Although the PCI relied on Soviet financial assistance more than any other Communist party supported by Moscow, declassified information shows this to be exaggerated.

According to the former KGB archivist Vasili Mitrokhin, Longo and other PCI leaders became alarmed at the possibility of a coup in Italy after the Athens Colonel coup in April 1967 that led to the Greek junta. These fears were not completely unfounded as there had been two attempted coups in Italy, Piano Solo in 1964 and Golpe Borghese in 1970, by military and neo-fascist groups. The PCI's Giorgio Amendola formally requested Soviet assistance to prepare the party in case of such an event. The KGB drew up and implemented a plan to provide the PCI with its own intelligence and clandestine signal corps. From 1967 through 1973, PCI members were sent to East Germany and Moscow to receive training in clandestine warfare and information gathering techniques by both the Stasi and the KGB. Shortly before the 1972 Italian general election, Longo personally wrote to Leonid Brezhnev asking for and receiving an additional $5.7 million in funding. This was on top of the $3.5 million that the Soviet Union gave the PCI in 1971. The Soviets also provided additional funding through the use of front organisations providing generous contracts to PCI members.

Leadership of Enrico Berlinguer  

In 1969, Enrico Berlinguer, the PCI deputy national secretary and later secretary general, took part in the international conference of the Communist parties in Moscow, where his delegation disagreed with the official political line and refused to support the final report. Unexpectedly to his hosts, his speech challenged the Communist leadership in Moscow. He refused to excommunicate the Chinese Communists and directly told Brezhnev that the Warsaw Pact invasion of Czechoslovakia, which he called "the tragedy in Prague", had made clear the considerable differences within the Communist movement on fundamental questions, such as national sovereignty, socialist democracy, and the freedom of culture. At the time, the PCI, which had absorbed the PSI's left-wing, the Italian Socialist Party of Proletarian Unity, so strengthening its leadership over the Italian left, was the largest Communist party in a capitalist state, garnering 34.4% of the vote in the 1976 Italian general election.

Relationships between the PCI and the Soviet Union gradually fell apart as the party moved away from Soviet obedience and Marxist–Leninist orthodoxy in the 1970s and 1980s and toward Eurocommunism and the Socialist International. The PCI sought a collaboration with the Socialist and Christian Democracy parties, a policy known the Historic Compromise. The kidnapping and murder of Aldo Moro, the DC leader, by the Red Brigades in May 1978 put an end to any hopes of such a compromise. The compromise was largely abandoned as a PCI policy in 1981. The Proletarian Unity Party merged into the PCI in 1984.

During the Years of lead, the PCI strongly opposed the terrorism and the Red Brigades, who in turn murdered or wounded many PCI members or trade unionists close to the PCI. According to Mitrokhin, the party asked the Soviets to pressure the StB, Czechoslovakia's State Security, to withdraw their support to the group, which Moscow was unable or unwilling to do. This, along with the Soviet invasion of Afganhistan, led to a complete break with Moscow in 1979. In 1980, the PCI refused to participate in the international conference of Communist parties in Paris; cash payments to the PCI continued until 1984.

Dissolution 
Achille Occhetto became general secretary of the PCI in 1988. At a 1989 conference in a working-class section of Bologna, Occhetto stunned the party faithful with a speech heralding the Revolutions of 1989, a move now referred to in Italian politics as the svolta della Bolognina (Bolognina turning point). The collapse of the Communist governments in the Eastern Europe led Occhetto to conclude that the era of Eurocommunism was over. Under his leadership, the PCI dissolved and refounded itself as the Democratic Party of the Left, which branded itself as a progressive left-wing and democratic socialist party. A third of the PCI membership, led by Armando Cossutta, refused to join the PDS, and instead seceded to form the Communist Refoundation Party.

Popular support 
In all its history, the PCI was particularly strong in Central Italy, in the Red Regions of Emilia-Romagna, Marche, Tuscany, and Umbria, as well as in the industrialised cities of Northern Italy. The party's municipal showcase was Bologna, which was held continuously by the PCI from 1945 onwards. Amongst other measures, the local PCI administration tackled urban problems with successful programmes of health for the elderly, nursery education and traffic reform, while also undertaking initiatives in housing and school meal provisions.

Communist administrations at a local level helped to aid new businesses while also introducing innovative social reforms. From 1946 to 1956, the Communist city council built 31 nursery schools, 896 flats, and 9 schools. Health care improved substantially, street lighting was installed, new drains and municipal launderettes were built and 8,000 children received subsidised school meals. In 1972, the then-mayor of Bologna, Renato Zangheri, introduced a new and innovative traffic plan with strict limitations for private vehicles and a renewed concentration on cheap public transport. Bologna's social services continued to expand throughout the early and mid-1970s. The city centre was restored, centres for the mentally sick were instituted to help those who had been released from recently closed psychiatric hospitals, handicapped persons were offered training and found suitable jobs, afternoon activities for schoolchildren were made less mindless than the traditional doposcuola (after-school activities), and school programming for the whole day helped working parents.

The electoral results of the PCI in general (Chamber of Deputies) and European Parliament elections since 1946 are shown in the chart above.

Election results

Italian Parliament

European Parliament

Leadership 
 Secretary: Antonio Gramsci (1926), Camilla Ravera (1927–1930), Palmiro Togliatti (1930–1934), Ruggero Grieco (1934–1938), Palmiro Togliatti (1938–1964), Luigi Longo (1964–1972), Enrico Berlinguer (1972–1984), Alessandro Natta (1984–1988), Achille Occhetto (1988–1991)
 President: Luigi Longo (1972–1980), Alessandro Natta (1989–1990), Aldo Tortorella (1990–1991)
 Leader in the Chamber of Deputies: Luigi Longo (1946–1947), Palmiro Togliatti (1947–1964), Pietro Ingrao (1964–1972), Alessandro Natta (1972–1979), Fernando Di Giulio (1979–1981), Giorgio Napolitano (1981–1986), Renato Zangheri (1986–1990), Giulio Quercini (1990–1991)
 Leader in the Senate: Mauro Scoccimarro (1948–1958), Umberto Terracini (1958–1973), Edoardo Pema (1973–1986), Gerardo Chiaromonte (1983–1986), Ugo Pecchioli (1986–1991)
 Leader in the European Parliament: Giorgio Amendola (1979–1980), Guido Fanti (1980–1984), Giovanni Cervetti (1984–1989), Luigi Alberto Colajanni (1989–1991)

Symbols

Notes

References

Further reading 
 Aldo Agosti, "The Comintern and the Italian Communist Party in Light of New Documents," in Tim Rees and Andrew Thorpe (eds.), International Communism and the Communist International, 1919–43. Manchester: Manchester University Press, 1998.
 Luigi Cortesi, Le origini del PCI. Laterza, 1972.
 Franco Livorsi, Amadeo Bordiga. Editori Riuniti, 1976.
 Paolo Spriano, Storia del Partito Comunista Italiano, vol. I Da Bordiga a Gramsci, Einaudi, 1967.
 La nascita del Partito Comunista d'Italia (Livorno 1921), ed. L'Internazionale, Milano 1981.
 La liquidazione della sinistra del P.C.d'It. (1925), L'Internazionale, Milano 1991.
 La lotta del Partito Comunista d'Italia (Strategia e tattica della rivoluzione, 1921–1922), ed. L'Internazionale, Milano 1984.
 Il partito decapitato (La sostituzione del gruppo dirigente del P.C.d'It., 1923–24), L'Internazionale, Milano 1988.
 Partito Comunista d'Italia, Secondo Congresso Nazionale – Relazione del CC, Reprint Feltrinelli, 1922.

External links 

 Historical Archive of the Communist Left with hundreds of documents of PCd'I
 Communist Party of Italy Archive at marxists.org
 sinistra.net Online Archive of the Communist Left
 Arrigo Cervetto, Class Struggles and the Revolutionary Party, 1964
 Biography of Arrigo Cervetto

1921 establishments in Italy
1991 disestablishments in Italy
Antonio Gramsci
Comintern sections
Defunct communist parties in Italy
Democratic socialist parties in Europe
Italy–Soviet Union relations
Political parties disestablished in 1991
Political parties established in 1921
Formerly banned communist parties